Julián Elías Gil Beltrán (born 13 June 1970) is an Argentine-Puerto Rican actor, model, businessman and TV host.

Personal life 
Although Julián Gil was born in Argentina, he lived some time in Venezuela as well. He grew up in Puerto Rico and he considers himself Puerto Rican. He has two sisters, Lorena and Patricia.

He was married to Brenda Torres. He has a daughter, Nicolle, and a son Jules. In 2016, he had a romantic relationship with Marjorie De Sousa with whom he had a son named Matías Gregorio Gil de Sousa, the relationship between De Sousa and Gil ended in 2017 in unfavorable terms.

Career 
At the age of 20, he began his career in television with his own shows Apartamento 52, where he was the principal conductor of both television shows. Over the years he has worked for television networks such as RCTV, Telemundo, Univisión and Televisa. From 2001 to 2006 he participated in several films such as Marina, Más allá del límite, Fuego en el alma, El milagro de Coromoto and La caja de problemas, films produced for television.

In 2006, he participated in the Venezuelan telenovela Por todo lo alto, where he interpreted the character "Halcón", which helped to internationalize.
The following year he joined the cast of the telenovela produced by Venevisión and Univisión entitled Acorralada, where he played Pancholón.

From 2007 until 2011, Gil was part of the jury Nuestra Belleza Latina, where he shared credits with Osmel Sousa.
In 2008 he participated in Valeria, at the same time he obtained his first antagonist role on television in the telenovela Amor comprado where he played Esteban Rondero.
Then he participated in the television series Gabriel, along with Chayanne.

In 2008 he obtained his first starring role in the telenovela Los Barriga. He starred beside the actress Claudia Bérninzon.

In 2009 he participated in the telenovela Sortilegio. In the same year he became the protagonist of the Spain series Valientes. That year he won the Califa de Oro Award for Best Actor.

In May 2015, Gil officially replaced Fernando Fiore as host of Republica Deportiva.

Filmography

Films

Television

Theater 
 2000: Nueve semanas y media
 2000: Sexo, pudor y lagrimas
 2001: En pelotas: Papito
 2002: Los gallos salvajes: Luciano Miranda Junior
 2002: El cotorrito by the sea: Bugambilia
 2004: La princesa en el lago de los cisnes
 2005: Luminaria: Franz
 2003: Tarzan – Salvemos la selva: Tarzan
 2005: El crimen del Padre Amaro: Padre Amaro Viera
 2007: Descarados
 2008: ¿Por qué los hombre aman a las cabronas?: Jorge
 2013: Aquel tiempo de campeones: Phil Romano
 2015: Divorciemonos mi amor: Benigna "Benny"

Awards and nominations

References

External links 

 Official site
 Biography of Julián Gil (en esmas.com)
 Miller Lite: Rivales at YouTube

1970 births
Living people
Argentine emigrants to Puerto Rico
Male actors from Buenos Aires
Puerto Rican male film actors
Puerto Rican male models
Puerto Rican male telenovela actors
Puerto Rican male stage actors
Puerto Rican male television actors
21st-century Puerto Rican male actors